Archeological Site No. 133.8 (also known as Maine Archeological Survey Site 133.8) is a historic site near Chesuncook, Maine. It was added to the National Register on April 25, 1986.

References

		
National Register of Historic Places in Piscataquis County, Maine